Abram Huston House and Carriage House, also known as the Coatesville City Hall and Police Station and "Graystone Mansion," is a historic  building located at Coatesville, Chester County, Pennsylvania.  It was designed and built in 1889, by the architectural firm of Cope & Stewardson.  The house is a -story building, built of shaped coursed stone, irregularly shaped in plan, and has a two-story wing added in 1925.  The carriage house is "L" shaped, and features a two-story tower with a conical roof.  The house was built as the home of Abram Huston, president of the Lukens Steel Company.  The house was Coatesville City Hall and the carriage house was the Coatesville jail from 1939 to 1992.

It was added to the National Register of Historic Places in 1977.

References

Houses on the National Register of Historic Places in Pennsylvania
Houses completed in 1889
Houses in Chester County, Pennsylvania
Coatesville, Pennsylvania
National Register of Historic Places in Chester County, Pennsylvania
Historic district contributing properties in Pennsylvania